USS Vigor is a name used more than once by the United States Navy:
 , a minesweeper laid down on 6 August 1941.
 , a minesweeper laid down on 16 June 1952 at Manitowoc, Wisconsin.

United States Navy ship names